The Highland Alliance League, is a small rugby union competition participated in by clubs (including some 2nd XVs) in the far north of Scotland. Together with the Grampian Alliance League, it is one of the few remaining leagues not part of the Scottish rugby union system, and therefore neither it nor its clubs are part of the Scottish League Championship structure.

It was not contested during 2006-2007, although Stornoway RFC did participate in the Brin Cup, a 2nd XV tournament.

Highland Alliance League, 2010-11

Rugby union leagues in Scotland